Letham Grange railway station served the Letham Grange estate, Angus, Scotland from 1883 to 1959 on the North British, Arbroath and Montrose Railway.

History 
The station opened on 1 May 1883 by the North British, Arbroath and Montrose Railway. The station was expanded with the doubling of the line in the 1890s. The goods yard was situated to the west. The station closed to both passengers on 22 September 1930 and to goods traffic on 1 July 1959.

References

External links 

Disused railway stations in Angus, Scotland
Former North British Railway stations
Railway stations in Great Britain opened in 1883
Railway stations in Great Britain closed in 1959
1883 establishments in Scotland